The Arab Organization for Human Rights is a Non-Governmental Organization (NGO) that works on human rights issues in the Arab World. It was founded with a resolution agreed on in Hammamet, Tunisia, in 1983.

Its general Assembly is held every three years, while the Board of Trustees meets annually, and consists of 25 members. 20 of the members are elected, while the remaining 5 are appointed by the AOHR. Its current headquarters is in Cairo, Egypt.

Among the organization's founders were French-Syrian sociologist Burhan Ghalioun, who later became first chairman of the Syrian National Council, and sociologist Saad Eddin Ibrahim.

Working fields

The organization aims to make life easier for Arab citizens, and to defend their rights, and defend them against any form of torture or persecution. The AOHR carries out continuous missions to free political prisoners in the Arab World.

The organization aims to "call for respect of human rights and fundamental freedoms of all citizens and residents of the Arab world; defends any individual whose human rights are subjected to violations which are contrary to the Universal Declaration of Human Rights, the International Covenant on Economic, Social and Cultural Rights and the International Covenant on Civil and Political Rights; endeavour, regardless of political considerations, to obtain release of detained or imprisoned persons, and seek relief and assistance for persons whose freedom is restricted in any way or who are subject to coercion of any kind because of their beliefs and political convictions, or for reasons of race, sex, colour or language; protest in cases where a fair trial is not guaranteed; provide legal assistance where necessary and possible; call for improvements in conditions of prisoners of conscience; work for amnesty of persons sentenced for political reasons." The AOHR’s goals include educating, training and documenting in the field of human rights.

The AOHR carries out field missions in an effort to release political prisoners, in some cases as an observer and in others as a member of the defence panel. It receives complaints from individuals, groups and organizations and contacts the relevant authorities. In addition to offering legal assistance in several cases, the organization provides financial assistance to families of victims. In coordination with the Arab Lawyers Union, it launched a campaign for Freedom for Prisoners of Conscience in the Arab World. It also arranges conferences and seminars. According to UNESCO it was instrumental in setting up the Arab Institute for Human Rights in Tunisia in 1989, in association with the Arab Lawyers Union, the Tunisian League for the Defence of Human Rights and with the support of the Centre for Human Rights in the United Nations.

AOHR maintains a consultative position at the Economic and Social Council of the United Nations and is also an observer in the Arab League and the African Union.

Report on Palestinian Authority
In December 2012, AOHR released a report that accused the Palestinian Authority (PA) of "inhumane practices and human rights violations" against Palestinian civilians. The AOHR alleges that from 2007-2011, the PA detained 13,271 Palestinians, and tortured 96% of them, resulting in six deaths. The report claims the PA law enforcement raided universities, hospitals and houses in order to arrest people wanted for protesting against the Israeli occupation. The report also claims that PA officers confiscated equipment and personal cash after arresting the suspects.

References

External links
  
 Profile at UNHCR

Arab League
Human rights organisations based in Egypt
International human rights organizations